British Legion could refer to:

The British Legion (or Royal British Legion), a British charity that provides support to armed forces' veterans 
Royal British Legion Industries (or RBLI) a British charity not affiliated with the RBL, that helps Armed Forces veterans, disabled people and people who are unemployed
British Legion (1860), a voluntary corps composed of Englishmen and Scots who fought for the unification of Italy, 1860–1861
British Legion (American Revolution), a British provincial regiment that served in the American Revolutionary War, 1777–1782
British Legions, foreign volunteer units, established in 1819, who fought against Spain in South America's independence wars

Other uses
British Auxiliary Legion, officially the Auxiliary Legion, a British expeditionary force sent to Spain in 1835 to serve in the First Carlist War
British German Legion, a group of German soldiers recruited to fight for Britain in the Crimean War, 1855–1856
British Legion Volunteer Police Force, a short-lived police force established in response to the outcome of the Munich Agreement in September 1938
Legio II Britannica (Roman Empire); see List of Roman legions

See also
 List of military legions
 American Legion (disambiguation)
 French Legion (disambiguation)
 German Legion (disambiguation)
 Legion (disambiguation)